Tiana Thomas-Ambersley (born 22 November 1995), known professionally as Tiana Major9, is a British singer-songwriter from London, England. She is currently signed to Motown and gained worldwide recognition with the Grammy nominated single "Collide", from the Queen & Slim soundtrack.

Early life
Tiana Major9 was born and raised in the London Borough of Newham, England and grew up in a Jamaican household, listening and singing gospel in church from the age of five. She studied music at the City and Islington College before she started pursuing it as a career. She gained local recognition she in 2014 as a finalist in MOBO's UnSung competition.

Musical career
Between 2017 and 2018, Tiana Major9 released singles "Merry Go", "Levee (Let It Break)", and "Mr. Mysterious". On 25 January 2019, she released her debut EP, Rehearsal @ NINE. She also appeared on Stormzy's album on the song "Rainfall" and the Queen & Slim soundtrack on the song "Collide", the latter being nominated for a Grammy Award. On 7 August 2020, she released her second EP titled At Sixes And Sevens, after signing with Motown.

Artistry
The name Major9 refers to the major 9th chord. Her sound has been compared to the likes of Amy Winehouse, Jazmine Sullivan, Marsha Ambrosius and Lauryn Hill. Her music blends elements of soul and R&B with jazz and reggae influences.

Discography

Extended plays

Singles

As lead artist

Guest appearances

Awards and nominations

References 

1995 births
Living people
21st-century Black British women singers
British contemporary R&B singers
British women hip hop musicians
English women singer-songwriters
English soul singers
Singers from London
People educated at the BRIT School